Mohammad Asif (born 1 January 1970, Karachi) is a Pakistani-born cricketer who played for the Oman national cricket team. He is a right-handed batsman and right-arm offbreak bowler. He made several appearances as a batsman in the 2005 ICC Trophy and has also played List A cricket for the Oman national cricket team.

References

1970 births
Living people
Omani cricketers
Pakistani emigrants to Oman
Pakistani expatriates in Oman
Cricketers from Karachi